An Enemy to the King is a 1916 silent film directed by Frederick A. Thomson.

The screenplay is based on the play An Enemy to the King by Robert Neilson Stephens which was first performed on Broadway at the Lyceum Theatre on 1 September 1896.

Plot 
In sixteenth-century France, Julie de Varion is told that her father, a Huguenot sympathiser, may be freed if she helps to capture Ernanton De Launay, an enemy of the king. In a tavern Julie meets a man who promises to bring her to Ernanton. In reality, the man in the tavern is Ernanton himself, who soon falls in love with Julie. He kills his own servant when the latter insists that she is a spy. In the end he discovers that Julie is working for the king, but, at the moment of betraying him, she refuses to hand him over to the king's men because she too has fallen in love. Ernanton follows her to the palace and gives himself up in order to save her father. When the Huguenots attack the palace, Julie's father is freed and Ernanton makes his escape.

Production 
The film was produced by the Vitagraph Company of America.

Distribution 
Distributed by Greater Vitagraph (V-L-S-E, Incorporated), the film opened in US cinemas on 26 November 1916.

Cast
 E.H. Sothern: Ernanton de Launay
 Edith Storey: Julie De Varion 
 John S. Robertson (as John Robertson): Claude Le Chastre 
 Frederick Lewis (as Fred Lewis): Gauillaume Montignac 
 Brinsley Shaw: Enrico, viscount de Berguin
 Rowland Buckstone: Blaise Tripault
 Mildred Manning: Jeanotte
 Pierre Collosse (as Pierre Colosse): Rougin
 Charles Mussett (as Charles Muzitt): Henry of Navarre
 Denton Vane: King Henry III 
 John Ardizoni (as Adrizonu): the Duc de Guise

References

External links 
 
 

1916 films
American films based on plays
American silent feature films
American historical adventure films
American black-and-white films
1910s historical adventure films
Vitagraph Studios films
Films directed by Frederick A. Thomson
1910s American films
Silent historical adventure films